Alain is a surname, and may refer to:
Jehan Alain (1911–1940), French organist and composer
Marie-Claire Alain (1926–2013), French organist and organ teacher
Olivier Alain (1918–1994), French organist, pianist, musicologist and composer